Bertha of Aragon (c. 1075 – bef. 1111) was a Queen consort of Aragon and Navarre. Nothing is known about her childhood or the names of her parents, it is believed that she is Italian since her name was Berta, which is Italian.

She was married to Peter I of Aragon in 1097, shortly after the death of Peter's first wife, Agnes of Aquitaine, with whom he had two children: Peter and Isabella. Bertha and Peter had no children.

Peter and Isabella were both dead by 1104 and King Peter needed an heir. They had no children and Peter died the following year. The crown of Aragon and Navarre passed to Alfonso who was the half brother of Peter.

Bertha got a dower but Alfonso got all of Peter's lands. It is unknown when Bertha died or where she died.

Genealogist Szabolcs de Vajay has speculated that Bertha may have been a daughter of Peter I, Count of Savoy, and another Agnes of Aquitaine, perhaps the Agnes who was the final wife of Peter's grandfather Ramiro I of Aragon and first-cousin of Peter's own first wife.

References

Aragonese queen consorts
Navarrese royal consorts
1070s births
1111 deaths
Burials at the Monastery of San Juan de la Peña
11th-century Spanish women
11th-century people from the Kingdom of Aragon
12th-century Spanish women
12th-century people from the Kingdom of Aragon